The Julius Hallgarten Prizes (defunct) were a trio of prestigious art prizes awarded by the National Academy of Design from 1884 to 2008. They recognized outstanding works exhibited in NAD's Annual Exhibition by American painters under age 35. A prize was awarded in each of three classes—the First Hallgarten for the best oil painting in the annual exhibition, the Second Hallgarten for the second-best, and the Third Hallgarten for the third-best. The winners were chosen by a vote of all the artists participating in each year's exhibition, and the prizes were accompanied by a cash award.

Winning a Hallgarten could give a tremendous boost to the career of a young painter. The prizes were held in especially high regard because the winners were selected by one's fellow artists.

The National Academy of Design's annual exhibitions became biennial in 2002. The last Hallgarten Prizes were awarded in 2008.

Julius Hallgarten
The prizes were established through a $12,000 endowment created in 1883 by stockbroker Julius Hallgarten (1840–1884).

The late Mr. JULIUS HALLGARTEN, of New York, endowed prizes of three hundred, two hundred and one hundred dollars, to be awarded respectively to the painters of the best three pictures in oil colors exhibited at each Annual Exhibition, under the following conditions:"All works will be considered to be in competition which have been painted in the United States by an American citizen under thirty-five years of age, and which have not before been publicly exhibited in the City or vicinity of New York. No competitor may take two prizes, or a prize of the same class a second time."The awards will be made by vote by ballot of all the Exhibitors of the season … Each artist will be entitled to one vote at each ballot, specifying his choice for each one of the three prizes, and each prize will be awarded to the painting receiving the highest number of votes for that prize, but no work will be entitled to the prize unless at least fifty of the exhibitors vote at the ballot, and the work receive one-third of all the votes cast."

Other Hallgarten Prizes
Julius Hallgarten also created an endowment of $5,000 for the National Academy of Design School of Art. Student winners of the Julius Hallgarten School Prize and Alfred N. Hallgarten Traveling Scholarship do not belong on this list.

Painters and works

1884–1929

1930–1969

1970–2008

References

National Academy of Design
American visual arts awards
Lists of American artists
Awards established in 1883
Awards disestablished in 2009
1883 establishments in New York (state)
2009 disestablishments in New York (state)